The French musical ensemble Les Talens Lyriques was created in 1991 in Paris, France, by the harpsichordist and orchestral conductor Christophe Rousset. This instrumental and vocal formation derives its name from the subtitle of Les fêtes d'Hébé (1739) an opera by Jean-Philippe Rameau.

Description 

The repertoire of Les Talens Lyriques extends from Monteverdi (L'incoronazione di Poppea, Il ritorno d'Ulisse in patria and L'Orfeo), Francesco Cavalli (La Didone and La Calisto) to Handel (Scipione, Riccardo Primo, Rinaldo, Admeto, Giulio Cesare, Serse, Arianna, Tamerlano, Ariodante, Semele and Alcina), taking in on the way Jean-Baptiste Lully (Persée, Roland, Bellérophon, Phaéton, Isis, Amadis and Armide), Henri Desmarets (Vénus et Adonis), Jean-Joseph Cassanéa de Mondonville (Les fêtes de Paphos), Cimarosa (Il Mercato di Malmantile, Il matrimonio segreto), Tommaso Traetta (Antigona and Ippolito ed Aricia), Jommelli (Armida abbandonata), Martin y Soler (La capricciosa corretta, Il Tutore burlato), Mozart (Mitridate, Die Entführung aus dem Serail and Cosi fan tutte), Salieri (La grotta di Trofonio, Les Danaïdes), Rameau (Zoroastre, Castor et Pollux, Les Indes galantes and Platée), Gluck (Bauci e Filemone) and Beethoven, and not forgetting Cherubini (Médée), García (Il Califfo di Bagdad), Berlioz, Massenet and Saint-Saëns.

The revival of such scores has gone hand in hand with close collaboration with stage directors and choreographers such as Pierre Audi, Jean-Marie Villégier, David McVicar, Éric Vigner, Jean-Pierre Vincent, Claus Guth, Robert Carsen, and David Hermann.

In addition to the lyrical repertoire, the ensemble also explores other musical genres such as the madrigal, cantata,  air de cour, symphony, and the vast repertoire of sacred music (masses, motets, oratorios, leçons de Ténèbres and much else), leading Les Talens Lyriques to perform everywhere in the world with forces varying from a handful of musicians to over sixty from all generations.

The discography of Les Talens Lyriques comprises around seventy titles on numerous labels: Erato, Fnac Music, Auvidis, Decca, Naïve, Ambroisie, Virgin Classics, Aparté and Outhere. The ensemble is also responsible for the much-acclaimed soundtrack of the film Farinelli (1994).

Since 2007 Les Talens Lyriques have been devoting some of their time to introducing secondary school pupils to the world of music with a programme of workshops and teaching residencies, leading a practical orchestral class and, from 2014, developing new and innovative technological resources designed to help young people discover and appreciate the Baroque repertoire.

The ensemble receives subsidies from the French Ministry of Culture and the City of Paris, and generous support from its Circle of Patrons. 

Since 2011 Les Talens Lyriques have been associate artists, in residence at the Singer-Polignac Foundation in Paris.
Les Talens Lyriques are founding members of FEVIS and PROFEDIM.

Recordings 
Les Talens Lyriques has recorded the following works:

Operas
Luigi Cherubini, Médée, 2012 - DVD BelAir Classiques
Antoine Dauvergne, Hercule Mourant, 2012 - Aparté
Henri Desmarets, Vénus & Adonis, 2007 - Ambroisie-Naïve
Manuel Garcia, Il Califfo di bagdad, 2007 - Archiv Produktion
Christoph Willibald Gluck, Philémon & Baucis, 2006 - Naïve-Ambroisie-Astrée
Charles Gounod, Faust, 2019 – Palazzetto Bru Zane
Georg Friedrich Haendel, Scipione, 1993 / 2010 - Aparté
Georg Friedrich Haendel, Riccardo Primo, re d’Inghilterra, 1996 - Decca
Georg Friedrich Haendel, Serse, 2005 - TDK
Niccolo Jommelli, Armida abbandonata, 2005 - Ambroisie
Stefano Landi, La morte d'Orfeo, 2020 - DVD Naxos
Jean-Baptiste Lully, Persée, 2001 - Astrée / Naïve
Jean-Baptiste Lully, Roland, 2004 - Ambroisie
Jean-Baptiste Lully, Bellérophon, 2011 - Aparté
Jean-Baptiste Lully, Phaéton (opéra), 2013 - Aparté
Jean-Baptiste Lully, Amadis (opéra), 2014 - Aparté
Jean-Baptiste Lully, Armide (opéra), 2015 - Aparté
Jean-Baptiste Lully, Alceste (opéra), 2017 - Aparté
Jean-Baptiste Lully, Isis (opéra), 2019 - Aparté
Jean-Baptiste Lully, Psyché (opera), 2023 - Château de Versailles Spectacles
Vicente Martin y Soler, La capricciosa corretta, 2004 - Naive Astrée
Vicente Martin y Soler, Il Tutore Burlato, 2007 - L’Oiseau-Lyre
Etienne-Nicolas Méhul, Uthal, 2016 - CD Palazzetto Bru Zane
Jean-Joseph Cassanéa de Mondonville, Les fêtes de Paphos, 1997 - Decca
Claudio Monteverdi, L’Incoronazione di Poppea, 2005 - DVD BBC / Opus Arte
Wolfgang Amadeus Mozart, Mitridate, rè di Ponto, 1999 - Decca
Jean-Philippe Rameau, Zoroastre, 2007 - DVD Opus Arte
Jean-Philippe Rameau, Castor & Pollux, 2008 - DVD Opus Arte
Jean-Philippe Rameau, Zaïs, 2015-CD Aparté
Jean-Philippe Rameau, Pygmalion, 2017-CD Aparté
Antonio Salieri, La grotta di Trofonio, 2005 - CD/DVD Ambroisie
Antonio Sacchini, Renaud, 2013 - Palazzetto Bru Zane
Antonio Salieri, Les Danaïdes, 2015 - CD Palazzetto Bru Zane
Antonio Salieri, Les Horaces, 2018 - CD Aparté
Antonio Salieri, Tarare, 2019 - CD Aparté
Antonio Salieri, Armida, 2021 - CD Aparté
Tommaso Traetta, Antigona, 2000 - Decca

Vocal
Pascal Collasse, Cantiques spirituels de Jean Racine, 1993 - Fnac Music
François Couperin, Motets, 1993 - Fnac Music
François Couperin, Leçons de ténèbres, Motets, Magnificat, 2000 - Decca
François Couperin, Couperin et moi, 2018 - Aparté
Daniel Danielis, Motets, 1993 - Koch Schwann
Daniel Danielis, Motets d’Uppsala, 1997 - Cyprès
Henri Dumont, Motets en dialogue, 1992 - Virgin
Handel/Sandrine Piau, Opera seria, 2004 - Naïve
Handel/Opera Arias Joyce DiDonato, Furore, 2008 - Virgin Classics
Leonardo Leo, Miserere - Musique sacrée, 2002 - Decca
Wolfgang Amadeus Mozart, Airs sacrés/Sandrine Piau, 2006 - DVD Armide classics
Wolfgang Amadeus Mozart, Betulia liberata, 2019 - Aparté
Giovanni Battista Pergolesi, Stabat Mater - Salve Regina, 1999 - Decca
Giovanni Battista Pergolesi, Stabat Mater, 2020 - Outhere
Henry Purcell, Harmonia Sacra/Rosemary Josha, 2010 - Aparté
De Lully à Gluck, Tragédiennes 1/Véronique Gens, 2006 - Virgin
De Gluck à Berlioz, Tragédiennes 2/Véronique Gens, 2009 - Virgin Classics
Méhul, Rodolphe Kreutzer, Salieri, Gluck, Gossec, Meyerbeer, Auguste Mermet, Berlioz, Saint-Saëns, Massenet, Verdi, Tragédiennes 3 Héroïnes romantiques/Véronique Gens”, 2011 - Virgin Classics
Lully, Rameau, Gluck, Desmarest, Les grandes eaux musicales de Versailles, 2008 - CD Ambroisie
 Jean-Baptiste Lully, Ballet royal de la Naissance de Vénus, 2021 - Aparté
Handel, Ricardo Broschi, Porpora, Johann Adolph Hasse, Pergolesi, Farinelli, Il castrato, 1994 - Naïve-Auvidis
Handel, Ricardo Broschi, Giacomelli, Porpora, Johann Adolph Hasse, Leonardo Leo, Farinelli - A portrait, live in Bergen/Ann Hallenberg , 2016- Aparté
Mozart, Haydn, Soler, Cimarosa, Salieri, Gazzaniga, Sarti/Roberto Scaltriti, Amadeus & Vienna, 1998 - Decca
José de Nebra, de Hita, Martin y Soler/Maria Bayo, Arias de Zarzuela barroca, 2003 - Naïve
Niccolo Jommelli, Mozart, Gluck, Myslivecek/Teodora Gheorghiu, Arias for Anna de Amicis, 2010 - Aparté

Instrumental
Johann Sebastian Bach, Sonates pour violon et clavecin, 2006 - Ambroisie
Johann Sebastian Bach, Wilhelm Friedemann Bach, Carl Philipp Emanuel Bach, Johann Christian Bach, The Bach Dynasty, 2007 - Naïve-Ambroisie
François Couperin, Les goûts réunis, 2001 - Decca
François Couperin, Les Nations, 2018 - Aparté
François Couperin, Couperin et moi, 2018 - Aparté
François Couperin, Concerts Royaux, 2018 - Aparté
Jean-Marie Leclair, Ouvertures et sonates en trio, 1993 - Fnac Music
Jean-Joseph Cassanéa de Mondonville, Pièces de clavecin avec violon, 1997 - Verany
Henry Purcell, Songs from Orpheus Britannicus/A. Mellon, W. Kuijken, 1993 - Astrée
Jean-Philippe Rameau, Ouvertures, 1997 - Decca
Jean-Philippe Rameau, Six concerts en sextuor, 2003 - Decca
Georg Philipp Telemann, Quatuors Parisiens, 1993 - Denon
Lully, Campra, Marin Marais, André Cardinal Destouches, Jacques Cordier, Musiques à danser à la cour et à l’opéra'', 1995 - Erato

References

External links
 Les Talens Lyriques

Musical groups from Paris
Musical groups established in 1991
1991 establishments in France